Marianivka is an urban-type settlement in Zviahel Raion, Zhytomyr Oblast, Ukraine. Population:  In 2001, population was 1,499.

References

Urban-type settlements in Zviahel Raion
Zhitomirsky Uyezd